Blackwater Township is an inactive township in Pettis County, in the U.S. state of Missouri.

Blackwater Township takes its name from Blackwater River.

References

Townships in Missouri
Townships in Pettis County, Missouri